Alois "Wisel" Kälin (born 13 April 1939) is a former Swiss Nordic skier who competed in the 1960s and 1970s. He won a Nordic combined silver at the 1968 Winter Olympics in Grenoble and a bronze in the 4 x 10 km cross-country skiing relay at the 1972 Winter Olympics in Sapporo. Additionally he won a bronze medal in the Nordic combined at the 1966 FIS Nordic World Ski Championships in Oslo.

Kälin was the first Swiss to win a Winter Olympic medal in Nordic skiing, earning his award on 11 February 1968, four days before his fellow countryman Josef Haas would earn a bronze in the 50 km cross country event. He is also the last person to earn medals in both cross-country skiing and the Nordic combined at the Winter Olympics.

External links
  (Nordic combined results)
 

1939 births
Living people
Nordic combined skiers at the 1964 Winter Olympics
Nordic combined skiers at the 1968 Winter Olympics
Swiss male Nordic combined skiers
Swiss male cross-country skiers
Olympic medalists in cross-country skiing
Olympic medalists in Nordic combined
FIS Nordic World Ski Championships medalists in Nordic combined
Medalists at the 1972 Winter Olympics
Medalists at the 1968 Winter Olympics
Olympic silver medalists for Switzerland
Olympic bronze medalists for Switzerland
Olympic cross-country skiers of Switzerland
Olympic Nordic combined skiers of Switzerland
Cross-country skiers at the 1964 Winter Olympics
Cross-country skiers at the 1968 Winter Olympics
Cross-country skiers at the 1972 Winter Olympics